Teenage Head is the third studio album by the San Francisco rock band Flamin' Groovies, released in March 1971 by Kama Sutra Records.

Teenage Head was recorded on a 16-track machine at Bell Sound Studios in New York City. 

It is listed in the 2006 book 1001 Albums You Must Hear Before You Die. Mick Jagger compared the album favorably to the Rolling Stones' contemporaneous Sticky Fingers. Jagger reportedly thought the Flamin' Groovies did the better take on the theme of classic blues and rock 'n roll revisited in an early 1970s context.

Track listing
All songs written by Cyril Jordan and Roy A. Loney except where noted.

Side 1
 "High Flyin' Baby"
 "City Lights"
 "Have You Seen My Baby?" (Randy Newman)
 "Yesterday's Numbers"

Side 2
 "Teenage Head"
 "32-20" (Robert Johnson, new lyrics by Roy A. Loney)
 "Evil Hearted Ada" (Loney)
 "Doctor Boogie"
 "Whiskey Woman"

CD bonus tracks
 "Shakin' All Over" (Fred Heath, Johnny Kidd)
 "That'll Be the Day" (Jerry Allison, Buddy Holly, Norman Petty)
 "Louie Louie" (Richard Berry)
 "Walkin' the Dog" (Rufus Thomas)
 "Scratch My Back" (Slim Harpo)
 "Carol" (Chuck Berry)
 "Going Out Theme"

Personnel
Flamin' Groovies
 Cyril Jordan – guitar, vocals
 Roy Loney – vocals, guitar
 Tim Lynch – guitar, harmonica
 George Alexander – bass guitar
 Danny Mihm – drums
 Jim Dickinson – piano

References

Flamin' Groovies albums
1971 albums